The Quote of the Day (QOTD) service is a member of the Internet protocol suite, defined in RFC 865. As indicated there, the QOTD concept predated the specification, when QOTD was used by mainframe sysadmins to broadcast a daily quote on request by a user. It was then formally codified both for prior purposes as well as for testing and measurement purposes.

A host may connect to a server that supports the QOTD protocol, on either TCP or UDP port 17. To keep the quotes at a reasonable length, RFC 865 specifies a maximum of 512 octets for the quote.

Although some sources indicate that the QOTD service is rarely enabled, and is in any case often firewalled to avoid denial-of-service attacks, interest continues in the pre-existing purpose of serving quotes as can be seen with web engine searches.

Current testing and measurement of IP networks is more commonly done with ping and traceroute, which are more robust adaptations of the echo protocol (RFC 862), which predated the attempt at QOTD standardization.

See also
 Wikiquote's Quote of the day

References

Internet protocols
Application layer protocols